Serbian New Zealanders (Serbian: Српски Новозеланђани/Srpski Novozelanđani) are New Zealand citizens of Serbian descent or Serbia-born people who reside in New Zealand.

In the 1940s, Serbian New Zealander potter Jovan Rancich designed many of the products of the Crown Lynn pottery range.

Notable people
 James Stosic, a New Zealand rugby player
 Nenad Vučinić, a Serbian-New Zealand basketball coach and former player

See also
 European New Zealanders
 Europeans in Oceania
 Immigration to New Zealand
 Pākehā

References

 
 
 
Serbian diaspora
European New Zealander